Pakhannge Monastery is a Buddhist monastery in Pakhannge village, SaLay Township, Magway Region, Myanmar (Burma). A historic site, the monastery is the largest extant Konbaung era wooden monastery in the country. In 1996, the Burmese government submitted the monastery, along with other exemplars from the Konbaung dynasty for inclusion into the World Heritage List.

The edifice was dedicated by Mindon Min's uncle, the Pakhan Mingyi Yan Way for the Pandu Sayadaw U Visuddha, a prominent Konbaung-era monk and teacher of Mindon Min.

The monastery construction required 7 years and 100 carpenters who used traditional architectural techniques. The wooden monastery was built using 332 teak pillars under the direction of Burmese architect Tha Gyi. Due to years of neglect, only the teak pillars and masonry work remain.

See also 
 Kyaung
 Myathalun Pagoda
 Tantkyitaung Pagoda
 Thihoshin Pagoda

References 

Monasteries in Myanmar
Buildings and structures in Magway Region
19th-century Buddhist temples
Religious buildings and structures completed in 1864
1886 establishments in Burma